The name Gilda has been used for three tropical cyclones in the Atlantic Ocean, nine in the western Pacific Ocean, and one in the southwest Indian Ocean.

Atlantic Ocean
 Tropical Storm Gilda (1954) – strong tropical storm that caused 29 deaths in Honduras before striking Belize
 Tropical Storm Gilda (1973) – first tropical cyclone on record to transition into a subtropical cyclone; caused six deaths in Jamaica and minor damage in Cuba, the Bahamas, and Florida

Western Pacific Ocean
 Tropical Storm Gilda (1952) (T5205) – weak tropical storm that struck China
 Typhoon Gilda (1956) (T5614) – attained super typhoon status and made landfall on Taiwan
 Typhoon Gilda (1959) (T5922, 56W) – super typhoon which moved across central Philippines, causing 23 deaths and leaving 60,000 homeless
 Typhoon Gilda (1962) (T6224, 74W) – remained over open waters before becoming extratropical east of Japan
 Tropical Storm Gilda (1965) (T6512, 15W, Narsing) – formed well east of the Philippines, weakens, and later becomes a strong tropical storm before moving ashore and dissipating over China
 Typhoon Gilda (1967) (T6737, 39W) – super typhoon which eventually strikes Taiwan as a minimal typhoon
 Typhoon Gilda (1971) (T7111, 11W, Mameng) – formed over the Philippines and dissipates over China
 Typhoon Gilda (1974) (T7408, 09W, Deling) – brought heavy rainfall to South Korea and Japan, causing 128 deaths and $1.5 billion in damage
 Typhoon Gilda (1977) (T7714, 15W) – remained over open waters, passing to the east of Japan

Southwest Indian Ocean
 Tropical Storm Gilda (1977) – remained over open waters

Atlantic hurricane set index articles
Pacific typhoon set index articles
South-West Indian Ocean cyclone set index articles